Steven Ronald Greaves (born 17 January 1970 in Chelsea, London, England), is an English footballer who played as a central defender. He played in the Football League for Fulham, Brighton & Hove Albion, Preston North End, Ipswich Town and Scunthorpe United.

References

External links

1970 births
Living people
English footballers
People from Chelsea, London
Fulham F.C. players
Waterford F.C. players
Brighton & Hove Albion F.C. players
Preston North End F.C. players
Ipswich Town F.C. players
Dagenham & Redbridge F.C. players
Scunthorpe United F.C. players
Sudbury Town F.C. players
Bishop's Stortford F.C. players
Cambridge City F.C. players
English Football League players
Association football defenders